Kolah Jub-e Olya-ye Do (also Romanized as Kolah Jūb-e ‘Olyā-ye Do) is a village in Howmeh Rural District, in the Central District of Gilan-e Gharb County, Kermanshah Province, Iran. At the 2006 census, its population was 218, in 43 families.

References 

Populated places in Gilan-e Gharb County